Sportfreunde Köllerbach is a German association football club from the district of Köllerbach in Püttlingen, Saarland.



History
The club was founded in 1931 and played as an unheralded local side until breaking through to the Verbandsliga Saarland (V) in 2002 on the strength of a Landesliga Südwest (VI) title. Köllerbach enjoyed continued success on promotion to the Verbandsliga Saarland, immediately winning their way to the Oberliga Südwest (IV). The club stumbled in their first season in fourth-tier play and was sent down in 2005, but returned to the Oberliga two seasons later.

From 2012 to 2013 the Oberliga Südwest was renamed Oberliga Rheinland-Pfalz/Saar, with Sportfreunde continuing in this league for another season until being relegated in 2013.

Honours
The club's honours:
 Verbandsliga Saarland (V)
 Champions: 2003, 2007
 Landesliga Saarland-Südwest (VI)
 Champions: 2002

Recent seasons
The recent season-by-season performance of the club:

 With the introduction of the Regionalligas in 1994 and the 3. Liga in 2008 as the new third tier, below the 2. Bundesliga, all leagues below dropped one tier. The Saarlandliga was introduced in 2009 and replaced the Verbandsliga Saarland at the sixth tier of football in the Saarland. In 2012 the Oberliga Südwest was renamed Oberliga Rheinland-Pfalz/Saar.

References

External links
 Official website 
 Sportfreunde Köllerbach at Weltfussball.de
 Das deutsche Fußball-Archiv historical German domestic league tables 

Football clubs in Germany
Football clubs in Saarland
Association football clubs established in 1931
1931 establishments in Germany